The Breeders 2YO Filly Trot is a harness racing event for two-year-old Standardbred female trotters. It is one part of the Breeders Crown annual series of twelve races for both Standardbred trotters and pacers. First run in 1985, it is contested over a distance of one mile. Race organizers have awarded the event to various racetracks across North America. The 2017 race will be held at Hoosier Park in Anderson, Indiana, United States.

Historical race events
Peace Corps won the race in 1988 in World Record Time. She went on to win her age group again  in  the 1989 Breeders Crown 3YO Filly Trot and won the 1990 Breeders Crown Open Mare Trot and that same race again in 1992, making her the only horse in history to win four Breeders Crown races.

In 2010, Pocono Downs became the first venue to host all 12 events on a single night.

North American Locations
Woodbine Racetrack (Wdb) Ontario (9)
Meadowlands Racetrack (Mxx) New Jersey (6)
Pompano Park (Ppk) Florida (6)
Mohawk Raceway (Moh) Ontario (5)
Garden State Park (Gsp) New Jersey (2)
Pocono Downs (Pcd) Pennsylvania (2)
Colonial Downs (Cln) Virginia (1) 
Hazel Park (Hpx) Michigan (1)
Canterbury Park (Cby) Minnesota (1)

Records
 Most wins by a driver
 5 – John Campbell (1988, 1991, 2004, 2007, 2008)

 Most wins by a trainer
 8 – Jimmy Takter (1993, 1996, 2004, 2005, 2012, 2013, 2015, 2016)

 Stakes record
 1:51 4/5 – Mission Brief (2014)

Winners of the Breeders Crown 2YO Filly Trot

See also
List of Breeders Crown Winners

External links
YouTube video of Peace Corps World Record win in the 1988 2yo Breeders Crown

References

Recurring sporting events established in 1984
Harness racing in the United States
Harness racing in Canada
Horse races in New Jersey
Horse races in Ontario